The 2018–19 Indian Super League playoffs was fifth playoffs series in the Indian Super League, one of the top Indian professional football leagues. The playoffs began in March 2018 and concluded with the final in March 2018 in Mumbai.

The top four teams from the 2018–19 ISL regular season had qualified for the playoffs. The semi-finals took place over two legs while the final was a one-off match at the Mumbai Football Arena.

The defending champions from last season, Chennaiyin, failed to qualify for the playoffs this season and thus were not able to defend their title. This was also NorthEast United's first playoff appearance.

Season table

Teams
 Bengaluru FC
 FC Goa
 NorthEast United FC
 Mumbai City FC

Bracket

Semi-finals

|}

Leg 1

Leg 2

Bengaluru won 4–2 on aggregate

Goa won 5–2 on aggregate

Final

References

2018–19 Indian Super League season